Frenching may refer to:
 Frenching (automobile), recessing or moulding a car body to give a smoother look to the vehicle
 French kissing, using the tongue in the act of kissing
 Exposing the bone on a rack of lamb

See also
 Frenching the Bully, an album by The Gits
 French kiss (disambiguation)